Trotwood-Madison City Schools is a school district serving Trotwood, Ohio, USA, including the former Madison Township.

Schools

Elementary schools
Madison Park grades 2–3
Westbrooke Elementary 4–5
Trotwood Early Learning Center (ELC) Pre-K–2

Middle and high schools
Trotwood-Madison High School 9–12th
Trotwood-Madison Middle School Grades 6–8

External links
Official website

Education in Montgomery County, Ohio
School districts in Ohio